, born April 16, 1973 in Osaka) is a former Japanese rugby union player. He played as a fly-half. His club team was Toyota Verblitz. He was nicknamed .

Hirose was awarded 40 caps for Japan; he made his debut in a 26-11 1995 Rugby World Cup qualifier win over South Korea, October 29, 1994 in Kuala Lumpur, Malaysia. In his career, Hirose scored 5 tries, 77 conversions, 79 penalties and 2 drop goals, reaching a national record of 422 points in aggregate. He was the primary goalkicker for Japan during his international career.

He played in just a single game at the 1995 Rugby World Cup, the infamous 145–17 defeat to New Zealand. Hirose scored 2 conversions and 1 penalty in the game.

In the 44–17 win over Tonga, at 8 May 1999, in Tokyo, during the Pacific Rim Championship, he kicked a then record of 9 penalties from 9 attempts.

He played in all three of Japan's games at the 1999 Rugby World Cup. His 5 penalties and 4 conversions (a total of 23 points) led his country in scoring. Hirose again played only once at the 2003 Rugby World Cup, in a 32–11 defeat to Scotland, at 12 October 2003, scoring 2 penalties.

His last international game came was on 5 November 2005, a 44–29 win over Spain, in Tokyo. Hirose had a memorable farewell, scoring 19 points through 5 conversions, 2 penalties and 1 drop goal. He was 32 years old.

References

External links

1973 births
Living people
Japanese rugby union players
Japanese rugby union coaches
Rugby union fly-halves
Japan international rugby union players
Toyota Verblitz players
Asian Games medalists in rugby union
Rugby union players at the 1998 Asian Games
Asian Games silver medalists for Japan
Medalists at the 1998 Asian Games